The Sirens Stadium is a stadium in St. Paul's Bay, Malta. It originally opened in 1970 with a sandy pitch, but introduced a new artificial pitch in 2011. It is the home ground of Maltese Premier League club Sirens F.C. It is also used by all Sirens teams from the youth teams up to senior teams for training. It has a capacity of 600. 

Sports venues completed in 1970
Football venues in Malta
Sirens F.C.
St. Paul's Bay